George Henry Crawford (15 December 1890 – 28 June 1975) was an English first-class cricketer, who played nine matches for Yorkshire County Cricket Club between 1914 and 1926. He also appeared for the Yorkshire Second XI in his last year in the first-class game.

Born in Hull, Crawford was a right arm fast bowler, he took 21 wickets at an average of 25.76, with a best of 5 for 59 against Surrey. A right-handed tail end batsman, he scored 46 runs, with a best of 21 against the Australians, at an average of 5.75. He also claimed 4 for 38 against the Australians in the match he played against them in 1926.
 
Crawford died in Hull aged 84, in June 1975.

References

Sources
Cricinfo Profile
Cricket Archive Statistics

1890 births
1975 deaths
Yorkshire cricketers
Cricketers from Kingston upon Hull
English cricketers
English cricketers of 1890 to 1918
English cricketers of 1919 to 1945